Hyllisia aethiopica is a species of beetle in the family Cerambycidae. It was described by Breuning in 1974.

References

aethiopica
Beetles described in 1974
Taxa named by Stephan von Breuning (entomologist)